Pullen or Pullens may refer to:
Pullens buildings, Victorian era tenement buildings in London, UK
Pullen Corner School, RI, USA
Pullen Island (Antarctica)
Pullen Island (South Australia)
Pullens Lane, Oxford, UK
Pullen Memorial Baptist Church, Baptist congregation in Raleigh, NC, USA
Pullen Park, public park in Raleigh, NC, USA
Pullen Park Carousel, carousel in Raleigh, NC, USA
Pullen Point, former name of Winthrop, Massachusetts
Pullen Strait, sea passage in the Canadian arctic
Pullens, Virginia, USA